Rose Farm is an unincorporated community and census-designated place (CDP) in southwestern York Township, Morgan County, and southeastern Harrison Township, Perry County, Ohio, United States. It lies along State Route 669 at its intersection with McKinley Street.  Ogg Creek, which meets the Moxahala Creek just north of Rose Farm, runs through the community.  It is located 13 miles (21 kilometers) northwest of McConnelsville, the county seat of Morgan County, and a much shorter distance southeast of Crooksville in nearby Perry County.

Rose Farm consists of 1st, 2nd, and 3rd Streets, which run parallel to State Route 669 and McKinley, Garfield, and Lincoln Streets, which run perpendicular to State Route 669.  One additional street, Argo Road, makes up the township roads of Rose Farm.

The Rose Farm Church of Christ (located on the corner of McKinley and 2nd Streets) is the only non-residential building in use within the community.  The other non-residential building is the old Rose Farm School, which is a two-room school house that served 1st through 8th grades until its closure in the mid-1960s.

Former United States Congressman Mell G. Underwood was born in Rose Farm.

References

External link

Census-designated places in Morgan County, Ohio
Census-designated places in Perry County, Ohio
Unincorporated communities in Ohio
Two-room schoolhouses